

Events

Pre-1600
 284 – Diocletian is chosen as Roman emperor.
 762 – During the An Shi Rebellion, the Tang dynasty, with the help of Huihe tribe, recaptures Luoyang from the rebels.
1194 – Palermo is conquered by Henry VI, Holy Roman Emperor.
1407 – John the Fearless, Duke of Burgundy, and Louis of Valois, Duke of Orléans, agree to a truce, but Burgundy would kill Orléans three days later.
1441 – The Peace of Cremona ends the war between the Republic of Venice and the Duchy of Milan, after the victorious Venetian enterprise of military engineering of the Galeas per montes.

1601–1900
1695 – Zumbi, the last of the leaders of Quilombo dos Palmares in early Brazil, is executed by the forces of Portuguese bandeirante Domingos Jorge Velho.
1739 – Start of the Battle of Porto Bello between British and Spanish forces during the War of Jenkins' Ear.
1776 – American Revolutionary War: British forces land at the Palisades and then attack Fort Lee. The Continental Army starts to retreat across New Jersey.
1789 – New Jersey becomes the first U.S. state to ratify the Bill of Rights.
1805 – Beethoven's only opera, Fidelio, premieres in Vienna.
1815 – The Second Treaty of Paris is signed, returning the French frontiers to their 1790 extent, imposing large indemnities, and prolonging the occupation by troops of Great Britain, Austria, Prussia, and Russia for several more years.
1820 – An 80-ton sperm whale attacks and sinks the Essex (a whaling ship from Nantucket, Massachusetts)  from the western coast of South America. (Herman Melville's 1851 novel Moby-Dick was in part inspired by this incident.)
1845 – Anglo-French blockade of the Río de la Plata: Battle of Vuelta de Obligado.
1861 – American Civil War: A secession ordinance is filed by Kentucky's Confederate government.
1873 – Garnier Expedition: French forces under Lieutenant Francis Garnier captured Hanoi from the Vietnamese.
1900 – The French actress Sarah Bernhardt receives the press at the Savoy Hotel in New York at the outset of her first visit since 1896. She talked about her impending tour with a troupe of more than 50 performers and her plans to play the title role in Hamlet.

1901–present
1910 – Mexican Revolution: Francisco I. Madero issues the Plan de San Luis Potosí, denouncing Mexican President Porfirio Díaz, calling for a revolution to overthrow the government of Mexico, effectively starting the Mexican Revolution.
1917 – World War I: Battle of Cambrai begins: British forces make early progress in an attack on German positions but are later pushed back.
1936 – José Antonio Primo de Rivera, founder of the Falange, is killed by a republican execution squad.
1940 – World War II: Hungary becomes a signatory of the Tripartite Pact, officially joining the Axis powers.
1943 – World War II: Battle of Tarawa (Operation Galvanic) begins: United States Marines land on Tarawa Atoll in the Gilbert Islands and suffer heavy fire from Japanese shore guns and machine guns.
1945 – Nuremberg trials: Trials against 24 Nazi war criminals start at the Palace of Justice at Nuremberg.
1947 – The Princess Elizabeth marries Lieutenant Philip Mountbatten, who becomes the Duke of Edinburgh, at Westminster Abbey in London.
1959 – The Declaration of the Rights of the Child is adopted by the United Nations.
1962 – Cuban Missile Crisis ends: In response to the Soviet Union agreeing to remove its missiles from Cuba, U.S. President John F. Kennedy ends the quarantine of the Caribbean nation.
1968 – A total of 78 miners are killed in an explosion at the Consolidated Coal Company's No. 9 mine in Farmington, West Virginia in the Farmington Mine disaster.
1969 – Vietnam War: The Plain Dealer (Cleveland, Ohio) publishes explicit photographs of dead villagers from the My Lai Massacre in Vietnam.
  1969   – Occupation of Alcatraz: Native American activists seize control of Alcatraz Island until being ousted by the U.S. Government on June 11, 1971.
1974 – The United States Department of Justice files its final anti-trust suit against AT&T Corporation. This suit later leads to the breakup of AT&T and its Bell System.
  1974   – The first fatal crash of a Boeing 747 occurs when Lufthansa Flight 540 crashes while attempting to takeoff from Jomo Kenyatta International Airport in Nairobi, Kenya, killing 59 out of the 157 people on board.
1977 – Egyptian President Anwar Sadat becomes the first Arab leader to officially visit Israel, when he meets Israeli prime minister Menachem Begin and speaks before the Knesset in Jerusalem, seeking a permanent peace settlement.
1979 – Grand Mosque seizure: About 200 Sunni Muslims revolt in Saudi Arabia at the site of the Kaaba in Mecca during the pilgrimage and take about 6000 hostages. The Saudi government receives help from Pakistani special forces to put down the uprising.
1980 – Lake Peigneur in Louisiana drains into an underlying salt deposit. A misplaced Texaco oil probe had been drilled into the Diamond Crystal Salt Mine, causing water to flow down into the mine, eroding the edges of the hole.
1985 – Microsoft Windows 1.0, the first graphical personal computer operating environment developed by Microsoft, is released.
1989 – Velvet Revolution: The number of protesters assembled in Prague, Czechoslovakia, swells from 200,000 the day before to an estimated half-million.
1990 – Andrei Chikatilo, one of the Soviet Union's most prolific serial killers, is arrested; he eventually confesses to 56 killings.
1991 – An Azerbaijani MI-8 helicopter carrying 19 peacekeeping mission team with officials and journalists from Russia, Kazakhstan and Azerbaijan is shot down by Armenian military forces in Khojavend District of Azerbaijan.
1992 – In England, a fire breaks out in Windsor Castle, badly damaging the castle and causing over £50 million worth of damage.
1993 – Savings and loan crisis: The United States Senate Ethics Committee issues a stern censure of California senator Alan Cranston for his "dealings" with savings-and-loan executive Charles Keating.
  1993   – Macedonia's deadliest aviation disaster occurs when Avioimpex Flight 110, a Yakovlev Yak-42, crashes near Ohrid, killing all 116 people on board.
1994 – The Angolan government and UNITA rebels sign the Lusaka Protocol in Zambia, ending 19 years of civil war. (Localized fighting resumes the next year.)
1996 – A fire breaks out in an office building in Hong Kong, killing 41 people and injuring 81.
1998 – A court in Taliban-controlled Afghanistan declares accused terrorist Osama bin Laden "a man without a sin" in regard to the 1998 U.S. embassy bombings in Kenya and Tanzania.
  1998   – The first space station module component, Zarya, for the International Space Station is launched from the Baikonur Cosmodrome in Kazakhstan.
2003 – After the November 15 bombings, a second day of the 2003 Istanbul bombings occurs in Istanbul, Turkey, destroying the Turkish head office of HSBC Bank AS and the British consulate.
2015 – Following a hostage siege, at least 19 people are killed in Bamako, Mali.
2022 – The 2022 FIFA World Cup begins in Qatar. This is the first time the tournament will be held in the Middle East.

Births

Pre-1600
 270 – Maximinus II, Roman emperor (d. 313)
 939 – Emperor Taizong of Song (d. 997)
1545 – Ernst Ludwig, Duke of Pomerania (d. 1592)

1601–1900
1602 – Otto von Guericke, German physicist and politician (d. 1686)
1603 – Fasilides, Ethiopian emperor (d. 1667)
1620 – Avvakum, Russian priest and saint (d. 1682)
1625 – Paulus Potter, Dutch painter (d. 1654)
1629 – Ernest Augustus, Duke of Brunswick-Luneburg (d. 1698)
1660 – Daniel Ernst Jablonski, Czech-German theologian and reformer (d. 1741)
1688 – Gyeongjong of Joseon, 20th king of the Joseon Dynasty (d. 1724)
1715 – Pierre Charles Le Monnier, French astronomer (d. 1799)
1726 – Oliver Wolcott, American politician (d. 1797)
1733 – Philip Schuyler, American general and senator (d. 1804)
1737 – José Antonio de Alzate y Ramírez, Spanish-Mexican scientist and cartographer (d. 1799)
1739 – Jean-François de La Harpe, French writer and literary critic (d. 1803)
1748 – Jean-François de Bourgoing, French diplomat, writer and translator (d. 1811)
1750 – Tipu Sultan, Indian ruler (d. 1799)
1752 – Thomas Chatterton, English poet (d. 1770)
1753 – Louis-Alexandre Berthier, 1st Prince of Wagram (d. 1815)
1755 – Stanisław Kostka Potocki, Polish noble, politician and writer (d. 1821)
1761 – Pope Pius VIII (d. 1830)
1776 – Ignaz Schuppanzigh, Austrian violinist (d. 1830)
1781 – Karl Friedrich Eichhorn, German captain and jurist (d. 1854)
  1781   – Bartolomeo Pinelli, Italian illustrator and engraver (d. 1835)
1782 – Georgius Jacobus Johannes van Os, Dutch painter (d. 1861)
1783 – Georgios Sinas, Greek entrepreneur and banker (d. 1856)
1784 – Marianne von Willemer, Austrian actress and dancer (d. 1860)
1787 – Johann Nicolaus von Dreyse, German firearms inventor and manufacturer (d. 1867)
1788 – Félix Varela, Cuban-born Roman Catholic priest (d. 1853)
1794 – Eduard Rüppell, German naturalist and explorer (d. 1884)
1801 – Mungo Ponton, Scottish inventor (d. 1880)
1808 – Albert Kazimirski de Biberstein, French orientalist (d. 1887)
1813 – Franz Miklosich, Slovenian linguist and philologist (d. 1891)
1830 – Mikhail Dragomirov, Russian general (1905)
1834 – Franjo Kuhač, Croatian conductor and composer (d. 1911)
1841 – Victor D'Hondt, Belgian mathematician, lawyer, and jurist (d. 1901)
  1841   – François Denys Légitime, Haitian general (d. 1935)
  1841   – Wilfrid Laurier, Canadian lawyer and politician, 7th Prime Minister of Canada (d. 1919)
1850 – Joseph Samuel Bloch, Austrian rabbi and deputy (d. 1923)
  1850   – Charlotte Garrigue, wife of Tomáš Garrigue Masaryk (d. 1923)
1851 – Mikhail Albov, Russian writer  (d. 1911)
1851 – John Merle Coulter, American botanist (d. 1928)
  1851   – Margherita of Savoy, Italian Queen consort (d. 1926)
1853 – Oskar Potiorek, Austro-Hungarian Army officer (d. 1933)
1855 – Josiah Royce, American philosopher (d. 1916)
1857 – Helena Westermarck, Finnish artist and writer (d. 1938)
1858 – Selma Lagerlöf, Swedish author and educator, Nobel Prize laureate (d. 1940)
1860 – José Figueroa Alcorta, President of Argentina, (d. 1931)
1861 – Camillo Laurenti, Italian Cardinal of the Roman Catholic Church (d. 1938)
1862 – Georges Palante, French philosopher and sociologist (d. 1925)
  1862   – Edvard Westermarck, Finnish philosopher and sociologist (d. 1939)
1864 – Percy Cox, British Indian Army officer (d. 1937)
1866 – Kenesaw Mountain Landis, American lawyer and judge (d. 1944)
  1866   – Maria Letizia Bonaparte, daughter of Prince Napoléon Bonaparte (d. 1926)
1867 – Patrick Joseph Hayes, American Cardinal of the Roman Catholic Church (d. 1938)
  1867   – Gustav Giemsa, German chemist and bacteriologist (d. 1948)
1869 – Zinaida Gippius, Russian writer and editor (d. 1945)
  1869   – Josaphata Hordashevska, Ukrainian Greek-Catholic nun (d. 1919)
1871 – William Heard Kilpatrick, American pedagogue (d. 1965)
  1871   – Augusto Weberbauer, German naturalist (d. 1948)
1873 – Ramón Castillo, Argentine politician (d. 1944)
  1873   – William Coblentz, American physicist (d. 1962)
  1873   – Georges Caussade, French composer (d. 1936)
  1873   – Daniel Gregory Mason, American composer and music critic (d. 1953)
1874 – James Michael Curley, American lawyer, politician, 53rd Governor of Massachusetts, and criminal (d. 1958)
1875 – Friedrich Werner von der Schulenburg, German diplomat (d. 1944)
1876 – Rudolf Koch, German designer (d. 1934)
1877 – Herbert Pitman, English sailor  (d. 1961)
1880 – Walter Brack, German swimmer (d. 1919)
1881 – Irakli Tsereteli, Georgian politician (d. 1959)
1882 – Ernestas Galvanauskas, Lithuanian engineer and politician (d. 1967)
1883 – Edwin August, American actor and director (d. 1964)
  1883   – Tony Gaudio, Italian American cinematographer (d. 1951)
1884 – Norman Thomas, American minister and politician (d. 1968)
1885 – George Holley, English footballer (d. 1942)
  1885   – Kaarlo Vasama, Finnish gymnast (d. 1926)
1886 – Robert Hunter, American golfer (d. 1971)
  1886   – Karl von Frisch, Austrian-German ethologist and zoologist, Nobel Prize laureate (d. 1982)
  1886   – Alexandre Stavisky, French financier and embezzler (d. 1934)
1887 – Jean Ducret, French footballer
1888 – Dennis Fenton, American sports shooter (d. 1954)
1889 – Edwin Hubble, American astronomer and cosmologist (d. 1953)
1890 – Robert Armstrong, American actor (d. 1973)
  1890   – Harald Madsen, Danish actor (d. 1949)
  1890   – Lauri Tanner, Finnish gymnast (d. 1950)
1891 – Reginald Denny, English actor (d. 1967)
1892 – James Collip, Canadian biochemist and academic, co-discovered insulin (d. 1965)
1893 – André Bloch, French mathematician (d. 1948)
  1893   – Grace Darmond, Canadian-American actress (d. 1963)
1894 – Johann Nikuradse, Georgian-born German engineer and physicist (d. 1979)
1895 – Pierre Cot, French politician (d. 1977)
1896 – Chiyono Hasegawa, Japanese supercentenarian (d. 2011)
  1896   – Carl Mayer, Austrian-Jewish screenplay writer (d. 1944)
1897 – Germaine Krull, German photographer and political activist (d. 1985)
1898 – Richmond Landon,  American high jumper (d. 1971)
  1898   – Adrian Piotrovsky, Russian dramaturge (d. 1937)
1899 – Alicja Kotowska, Polish nun (d. 1939)
1900 – Florieda Batson, American Olympic hurdler (d. 1996)
  1900   – Helen Bradley, English painter (d. 1979)
  1900   – Chester Gould, American cartoonist and author, created Dick Tracy (d. 1985)

1901–present
1901 – José Leandro Andrade, Uruguayan footballer (d. 1957)
1902 – Gianpiero Combi, Italian footballer (d. 1956)
  1902   – Erik Eriksen, Danish politician (d. 1972)
  1902   – Heini Meng, Swiss ice hockey player (d. 1982)
  1902   – Jean Painlevé, French photographer and filmmaker (d. 1989)
  1902   – Philipp Schmitt, German officer of the Schutzstaffel (d. 1950)
1903 – Alexandra Danilova, Russian-American ballerina and choreographer (d. 1997)
  1903   – Ishtiaq Hussain Qureshi, Pakistani historian and educator (d. 1981)
1904 – Arnold Gartmann, Swiss bobsledder (d. 1980)
1905 – Minoo Masani, Indian lawyer and politician (d. 1998)
1906 – Vera Tanner, English swimmer (d. 1971)
1907 – Fran Allison, American entertainer (d. 1989)
  1907   – Mihai Beniuc, Romanian writer (d. 1988)
  1907   – Henri-Georges Clouzot, French film director, screenwriter and producer (d. 1977)
  1907   – Anni Rehborn, German swimmer (d. 1987)
1908 – Louis, Prince of Hesse and by Rhine, the youngest son of Ernest Louis, Grand Duke of Hesse (d. 1968)
  1908   – Alistair Cooke, British-American journalist and author (d. 2004)
  1908   – Jenő Vincze, Hungarian footballer (d. 1988)
1909 – John Berger, Swiss cross-country skier (d. 2002)
  1909   – Vicente Feola, Brazilian football manager and coach (d. 1975)
  1909   – Piero Gherardi, Italian costume and set designer (d. 1971)
  1909   – Samand Siabandov, Soviet Red Army writer (d. 1989)
1910 – Willem Jacob van Stockum, Dutch mathematician, pilot, and academic (d. 1944)
  1910   – Pauli Murray, American civil rights activist, women's rights activist, lawyer, Episcopal priest, and author (d. 1985)
1911 – Eduard Kainberger, Austrian footballer (d. 1974)
  1911   – David Seymour, Polish photographer (d. 1956)
  1911   – Jean Shiley, American high jumper (d. 1998)
  1911   – Rupert Weinstabl, Austrian sprint canoeist (d. 1953)
  1911   – Paul Zielinski, German footballer (d. 1966)
1912 – Enrique Garcia, Argentine footballer (d. 1969)
  1912   – Otto von Habsburg, the last Crown Prince of Austria-Hungary (d. 2011)
1913 – Franz Berghammer, Austrian field handballer (d. 1944)
  1913   – Charles Berlitz, American linguist (d. 2003)
  1913   – Charles Bettelheim, French Marxian economist and historian (d. 2006)
  1913   – Judy Canova, American actress and comedian (d. 1983)
  1913   – Kostas Choumis, Greek footballer (d. 1981)
  1913   – Russell Rouse, American screenwriter, director and producer (d. 1987)
  1913   – Libertas Schulze-Boysen, German opponent of the Nazis (d. 1942)
  1913   – Yakov Zak, Soviet pianist (d. 1976)
1914 – Emilio Pucci, Italian fashion designer and politician (d. 1992)
  1914   – Kurt Lundqvist, Swedish high jumper (d. 1976)
1915 – Kon Ichikawa, Japanese director, producer, and screenwriter (d. 2008)
  1915   – Hu Yaobang, Chinese politician (d. 1989)
1916 – Charles E. Osgood, American psychologist (d. 1991)
  1916   – Michael J. Ingelido, American general (d. 2015)
  1916   – Evelyn Keyes, American actress (d. 2008)
  1916   – Donald T. Campbell, American social scientist (d. 1996)
1917 – Robert Byrd, American lawyer and politician (d. 2010)
  1917   – Leonard Jimmie Savage, American mathematician (d. 1971)
  1917   – Erich Leo Lehmann, American statistician (d. 2009)
  1917   – Bobby Locke, South African golfer (d. 1987)
1918 – Corita Kent, American nun, illustrator, and educator (d. 1986)
  1918   – Dora Ratjen, German high jumper (d. 2008)
1919 – Alan Brown, English race car driver (d. 2004)
  1919   – Phyllis Thaxter, American actress (d. 2012)
1920 – Douglas Dick, American actor and psychologist (d. 2015)
1921 – Jim Garrison, American lawyer and judge (d. 1992)
1923 – Gunnar Åkerlund, Swedish sprint canoer (d. 2006)
  1923   – Danny Dayton, American actor and director (d. 1999)
  1923   – Tonino Delli Colli, Italian cinematographer (d. 2005)
  1923   – Nadine Gordimer, South African novelist, short story writer, and activist, Nobel Prize laureate (d. 2014)
1924 – Karen Harup, Danish swimmer (d. 2009)
  1924   – Timothy Evans, (d. 1950)
  1924   – Benoit Mandelbrot, Polish-American mathematician and economist (d. 2010)
  1924   – Michael Riffaterre, French literary critic and theorist (d. 2006)
  1924   – Henk Vredeling, Dutch agronomist and politician, Dutch Minister of Defence (d. 2007)
1925 – June Christy, American singer (d. 1990)
  1925   – Robert F. Kennedy,  US Navy officer, lawyer, and politician, 64th United States Attorney General (d. 1968)
  1925   – Maya Plisetskaya, Russian-Lithuanian ballerina, choreographer, actress, and director (d. 2015)
1926 – John Gardner, English soldier and author (d. 2007)
  1926   – Tôn Thất Đính, Vietnamese general (d. 2013)
  1926   – Édouard Leclerc, French businessman and entrepreneur (d. 2012)
  1926   – Miroslav Tichý, Czech photographer (d. 2011)
1927 – Vakhtang Balavadze, Georgian wrestler (d. 2018)
  1927   – Ed Freeman, American soldier and pilot, Medal of Honor recipient (d. 2008)
  1927   – Estelle Parsons, American actress and director
  1927   – Wolfgang Schreyer, German writer (d. 2017)
  1927   – Mikhail Ulyanov, Soviet and Russian actor (d. 2007)
1928 – Aleksey Batalov, Russian actor, director, and screenwriter (d. 2017)
  1928   – Franklin Cover, American actor (d. 2006)
  1928   – Pedro Ferrándiz, Spanish basketball coach
  1928   – John Disley, Welsh athlete (d. 2016)
  1928   – Pete Rademacher, American boxer
  1928   – Genrikh Sapgir, Russian writer (d. 1999)
1929 – Jerry Hardin, American actor
  1929   – Raymond Lefèvre, French composer (d. 2008)
  1929   – Gabriel Ochoa Uribe, Colombian footballer
  1929   – Ron Willey, Australian rugby league player and coach  (d. 2004)
1930 – Christine Arnothy, French writer (d. 2015)
  1930   – Aarón Hernán, Mexican actor
  1930   – Bernard Horsfall, English-Scottish actor (d. 2013)
  1930   – Choe Yong-rim, North Korean Premier
1931 – Wayne Moore, American swimmer (d. 2015)
1932 – Richard Dawson, English-American actor and game show host (d. 2012)
  1932   – Yorozuya Kinnosuke, Japanese kabuki actor (d. 1997)
  1932   – Sándor Mátrai, Hungarian footballer (d. 2002)
  1932   – Paulo Valentim, Brazilian footballer (d. 1984)
  1932   – Colville Young, Governor-General of Belize
1934 – Paco Ibáñez, Spanish singer and musician
  1934   – Lev Polugaevsky, Soviet Chess Grandmaster (d. 1995)
1935 – Leo Falcam, Micronesian politician and 5th President of Micronesia (d. 2018)
  1935   – Imre Makovecz, Hungarian architect (d. 2011)
1936 – Hans van Abeelen, Dutch geneticist (d. 1998)
  1936   – Don DeLillo, American novelist, essayist, and playwright
  1936   – Luciano Fabro, Italian sculptor and artist (d. 2007)
  1936   – Charles R. Larson, American admiral (d. 2014)
1937 – René Kollo, German tenor
  1937   – Ruth Laredo, American pianist and educator (d. 2005)
  1937   – Eero Mäntyranta, Finnish skier (d. 2013)
  1937   – Bruno Mealli, Italian cyclist
  1937   – Viktoriya Tokareva, Russian author and screenwriter
1938 – Colin Fox, Canadian actor
1939 – Jerry Colangelo, American businessman
  1939   – Copi, Argentine writer and artist (d. 1987)
  1939   – Dick Smothers, American actor and comedian
  1939   – Jan Szczepański, Polish boxer (d. 2017)
1940 – Wendy Doniger, American indologist
  1940   – Helma Sanders-Brahms, German director, producer, and screenwriter (d. 2014)
  1940   – Ediz Hun, Turkish actor and politician
  1940   – Arieh Warshel, Israeli-American biochemist and biophysicist
1941 – Oliver Sipple, U.S. Marine and Vietnam War veteran (d. 1989)
  1941   – Dr. John, American singer and songwriter (d. 2019) 
1942 – Joe Biden, American politician, 46th President of the United States
  1942   – Bob Einstein, American actor, producer, and screenwriter (d. 2019)
  1942   – Norman Greenbaum, American singer-songwriter and guitarist
  1942   – Meredith Monk, American composer and choreographer
  1942   – Paulos Faraj Rahho, Chaldean Catholic Archeparch of Mosul (d. 2008)
1943 – David Douglas-Home, British businessman and politician
  1943   – Veronica Hamel, American actress and model
  1943   – Ivan Hrdlička, Czechoslovak footballer
  1943   – Suze Rotolo, American artist
1944 – Louie Dampier, American basketball player and coach
  1944   – Wayne Maki, Canadian ice hockey player (d. 1974)
  1944   – Anthea Stewart, Zimbabwean field hockey player
1945 – Deborah Eisenberg, American writer, actress and teacher
1946 – Duane Allman, American singer-songwriter and guitarist (d. 1971)
  1946   – Algimantas Butnorius, Lithuanian chess Grandmaster (d. 2017)
  1946   – Patriarch Kirill of Moscow
  1946   – Samuel E. Wright, American actor, voice actor and singer (d. 2021)
1947 – Nurlan Balgimbayev, Prime Minister of Kazakhstan (d. 2015)
  1947   – Eli Ben Rimoz, Israeli footballer
  1947   – Joe Walsh, American singer-songwriter, guitarist, producer, and actor
1948 – John R. Bolton, American lawyer and diplomat, 25th United States Ambassador to the United Nations
  1948   – Park Chul-soo, South Korean director, producer, and screenwriter (d. 2013)
  1948   – Barbara Hendricks, American-Swedish soprano and actress
  1948   – Richard Masur, American actor and director
  1948   – Gunnar Nilsson, Swedish race car driver (d. 1978)
  1948   – Kenjiro Shinozuka, Japanese race car driver
1949 – Jeff Dowd, American film producer and activist
  1949   – Thelma Drake, American politician
  1949   – Ulf Lundell, Swedish writer and composer
  1949   – Juha Mieto, Finnish cross-country skier
  1949   – Nené, Portuguese footballer
1950 – Jacqueline Gourault, French politician
  1950   – Gary Green, British musician
1951 – Rodger Bumpass, American actor and singer
  1951   – León Gieco, Argentine folk rock singer and interpreter
  1951   – Aleksey Spiridonov, Soviet footballer (d. 1998)
  1951   – David Walters, American businessman and politician, 24th Governor of Oklahoma
1952 – John Van Boxmeer, Canadian ice hockey player and coach
1953 – Fábio Jr., Brazilian singer-songwriter and actor
  1953   – Greg Gibson, American wrestler
  1953   – Halid Bešlić, Bosnian musician and singer
  1953   – Nirmal Selvamony, Indian Tamil academician and ecocritic
1954 – Richard Brooker, English actor and stuntman (d. 2013)
  1954   – Antonina Koshel, Soviet artistic gymnast
  1954   – Frank Marino, Canadian guitarist and singer-songwriter
  1954   – Bin Shimada, Japanese voice actor
1955 – Angela Finocchiaro, Italian actress
  1955   – Toshio Matsuura, Japanese footballer
  1955   – Ray Ozzie, American software industry entrepreneur
1956 – Bo Derek, American actress and producer
1957 – Stefan Bellof, German race car driver (d. 1985)
  1957   – John Eriksen, Danish footballer (d. 2002)
  1957   – Jean-Marc Furlan, French football manager
  1957   – Goodluck Jonathan, President of Nigeria
1958 – Rickson Gracie, Brazilian mixed martial artist and choreographer
1959 – Diane James, British politician
  1959   – Mario Martone, Italian director and screenwriter
  1959   – Franz-Peter Tebartz-van Elst, German prelate of the Catholic Church and theologian
  1959   – Sean Young, American actress and dancer
1960 – Ye Jiangchuan, Chinese chess player
  1960   – Ozell Jones, American basketball player (d. 2006)
1961 – Pierre Hermé, French pastry chef and chocolatier
  1961   – Petra Wenzel, Liechtenstein alpine skier
1962 – Živko Budimir, Bosnian politician
  1962   – Polona Dornik, Yugoslav and Slovenian basketball player
  1962   – Rajkumar Hirani, Indian director
  1962   – Abderrazak Khairi, Moroccan footballer
  1962   – Peng Liyuan, wife of Xi Jinping
  1962   – Gerardo Martino, Argentine footballer
1963 – Tim Gavin, Australian rugby player
  1963   – Timothy Gowers, English mathematician and academic
  1963   – Beezie Madden, American show jumper
  1963   – Ming-Na Wen, Chinese-American actress
1964 – Katharina Böhm, Austrian actress
  1964   – Boris Dežulović, Croatian journalist and author
  1964   – Andriy Kalashnykov, Ukrainian wrestler
  1964   – John MacLean, Canadian ice hockey player and coach
1965 – Mike D, American rapper and drummer
  1965   – Nigel Gibbs, English footballer and coach
  1965   – Yehuda Glick, American-Israeli Orthodox rabbi
  1965   – Amos Mansdorf, Israeli tennis player
  1965   – Takeshi Kusao, Japanese actor and singer
  1965   – Jimmy Vasser, American race car driver
  1965   – Yoshiki, Japanese musician
1966 – Neil Broad, British tennis player
  1966   – Kevin Gilbert, American singer-songwriter and musician (d. 1996)
  1966   – Terry Lovejoy, Australian information technologist
  1966   – Štefan Svitek, Slovak basketball coach
  1966   – Jill Thompson, American author and illustrator
1967 – Chris Childs, American basketball player
  1967   – Stuart Ripley, English footballer
  1967   – Teoman, Turkish singer
1968 – James Dutton, American astronaut
  1968   – Andrei Kharlov, Russian chess player
  1968   – Paul Scheuring, American screenwriter and director
  1968   – David Einhorn, American hedge fund manager
  1968   – Jeff Tarango, American tennis player
1969 – Jimmy Blandon, Ecuadorian footballer
  1969   – Kristian Ghedina, Italian alpine ski racer
  1969   – Chris Harris, New Zealand cricketer
  1969   – Wolfgang Stark, German football referee
  1969   – Callie Thorne, American actress and producer
1970 – Mansour bin Zayed Al Nahyan, deputy prime minister of the United Arab Emirates
  1970   – Matt Blunt, American lieutenant and politician, 54th Governor of Missouri
  1970   – Phife Dawg, American rapper (d. 2016)
  1970   – Delia Gonzalez, American boxer
  1970   – Stéphane Houdet, French wheelchair tennis player
  1970   – Geoffrey Keezer, American pianist and educator
  1970   – Sabrina Lloyd, American actress
1971 – Mike Dunn, English snooker player
  1971   – Joey Galloway, American football player and sportscaster
  1971   – Joel McHale, American comedian, actor, and producer
1972 – Johan Åkerman, Swedish ice hockey player
  1972   – Jérôme Alonzo, French footballer
  1972   – Ed Benes, Brazilian comic book artist
  1972   – Paulo Figueiredo, Angolan footballer
  1972   – Corinne Niogret, French biathlete
  1972   – Skander Souayah, Tunisian footballer
  1972   – Tatiana Turanskaya, Transnistrian politician
1973 – Angelica Bridges, American actress and singer
  1973   – Fabio Galante, Italian footballer
  1973   – Neil Hodgson, English motorcycle racer and sportscaster
  1973   – Masaya Honda, Japanese footballer
1974 – Daniela Anschütz-Thoms, German speed skater
  1974   – Jason Faunt, American actor
  1974   – Florian David Fitz, German actor, screenwriter and director
  1974   – Drew Ginn, Australian rower
  1974   – Claudio Husain, Argentine footballer
  1974   – Jon Knudsen, Norwegian footballer
1975 – Mengke Bateer, Chinese Inner Mongolian basketball player
  1975   – Dierks Bentley, American singer-songwriter and guitarist
  1975   – Ryan Bowen, American basketball player and coach
  1975   – J. D. Drew, American baseball player
  1975   – Joshua Gomez, American actor
  1975   – Sébastien Hamel, French footballer
  1975   – Davey Havok, American singer-songwriter
1976 – Mohamed Barakat, Egyptian footballer
  1976   – Beto, Brazilian footballer
  1976   – DeJuan Collins, American basketball player
  1976   – Dominique Dawes, American gymnast and actress
  1976   – Laura Harris, Canadian actress
  1976   – Adrián Hernán González, Argentine footballer
  1976   – Harold Jamison, American basketball player
  1976   – Tusshar Kapoor, Indian Bollywood actor and producer
  1976   – Pascal Roller, German basketball player
  1976   – Francisco Rufete, Spanish footballer
  1976   – Nebojša Stefanović, Serbian politician
  1976   – Doug Viney, New Zealand boxer
  1976   – Atsushi Yoneyama, Japanese footballer
  1976   – Ji Yun-nam, North Korean footballer
1977 – Rudy Charles, American wrestling referee
  1977   – Mikhail Ivanov, Russian cross-country skier
  1977   – Daniel Svensson, Swedish drummer and producer
  1977   – Josh Turner, American singer-songwriter, guitarist, and actor
1978 – Jean-François Bedenik, French footballer and coach
  1978   – Freya Lim, Taiwanese-Malaysian singer and radio host
  1978   – Kéné Ndoye, Senegalese track and fielder
  1978   – Nadine Velazquez, American actress and model
1979 – Maree Bowden, New Zealand netball player
  1979   – Dmitri Bulykin, Russian footballer
  1979   – Kateryna Burmistrova, Ukrainian wrestler
  1979   – Naide Gomes, Portuguese heptathlete and long jumper
  1979   – Joseph Hallman, American composer and academic
  1979   – Anastasiya Kapachinskaya, Russian sprint athlete
  1979   – Hassan Mostafa, Egyptian footballer
  1979   – Jacob Pitts, American actor
  1979   – Shalini, Indian actress
  1979   – Arpad Sterbik, Serbian handball player
1980 – Dilnaz Akhmadieva, Kazakhstani singer and actress
  1980   – James Chambers, English footballer
  1980   – Eiko Koike, Japanese actress
  1980   – Poonsawat Kratingdaenggym, Thai boxer
  1980   – Marek Krejčí, Slovak footballer (d. 2007)
  1980   – Ana Caterina Morariu, Romanian-Italian actress
  1980   – Christian Obrist, Italian middle-distance runner
  1980   – Eoin Reddan, Irish rugby union player
1981 – Carlos Boozer, American basketball player
  1981   – Yuko Kavaguti, Japanese ice skater
  1981   – Ye Li, Chinese basketball player
  1981   – Andrea Riseborough, English actress
  1981   – İbrahim Toraman, Turkish footballer
  1981   – Orsolya Tóth, Hungarian actress
  1981   – Kimberley Walsh, English singer-songwriter and actress
1982 – Stephen Ademolu, Canadian footballer
  1982   – Dương Hồng Sơn, Vietnamese footballer
  1982   – Rémi Mathis, French historian and curator
  1982   – Shermine Shahrivar, Iranian model
  1982   – Gregor Urbas, Slovenian figure skater
  1982   – Israel Villaseñor, Mexican footballer
1983 – Future, American rapper
  1983   – Dele Aiyenugba, Nigerian footballer
  1983   – Mónika Kovacsicz, Hungarian handballer
1984 – Ali, South Korean singer
  1984   – Halley Feiffer, American actress and playwright
  1984   – Kévin Hecquefeuille, French ice hockey player
  1984   – Justin Hoyte, English   footballer
  1984   – Jeremy Jordan, American actor
  1984   – Cartier Martin, American basketball player
  1984   – Nelson Sebastián Maz, Uruguayan footballer
  1984   – Sherjill MacDonald, Dutch footballer
  1984   – Moe Meguro, Japanese curler
  1984   – Ferdinando Monfardini, Italian race car driver
  1984   – Florencia Mutio, Argentine field hockey player
  1984   – Stéphane N'Guéma, Gabonese footballer
  1984   – Naoya Tamura, Japanese footballer
  1984   – Monique van der Vorst, Dutch cyclist
  1984   – Lee Yun-yeol, South Korean gamer
1985 – Juan Cruz Álvarez, Argentinian race car driver
  1985   – Eric Boateng, British basketball player
  1985   – Dan Byrd, American actor
  1985   – Muhamed Demiri, Macedonian footballer
  1985   – Greg Holland, American baseball player
  1985   – Maria Mukhortova, Russian skater
  1985   – Heinrich Schmidtgal, Kazakhstani footballer
  1985   – Themistoklis Tzimopoulos, Greek New Zealander footballer
  1985   – Aaron Yan, Taiwanese actor and singer
1986 – Josh Carter, American basketball player
  1986   – Edder Delgado, Honduran footballer
  1986   – Ashley Fink, American actress and singer
  1986   – Kōhei Horikoshi, Japanese manga artist
  1986   – Özer Hurmacı, Turkish footballer
  1986   – William Fernando da Silva, Brazilian footballer
  1986   – Oliver Sykes, English singer-songwriter
  1986   – Bartolomé Salvá Vidal, Spanish tennis player
  1986   – Koudai Tsukakoshi, Japanese race car driver
1987 – Amelia Rose Blaire, American actress
  1987   – Andrew Driver, English footballer
  1987   – Ben Hamer, English footballer
  1987   – Mylène Lazare, French swimmer
  1987   – Kou Lei, Ukrainian table tennis player
  1987   – Nathan Lyon, Australian cricketer
  1987   – Joëlle Numainville, Canadian cyclist
  1987   – Christoph Pfingsten, German cyclist
  1987   – Valdet Rama, Albanian footballer
  1987   – Gina Stechert, German alpine skier
1988 – Marie-Laure Brunet, French biathlete
  1988   – Aya Medany, Egyptian modern pentathlete.
  1988   – Max Pacioretty, American ice hockey player
  1988   – Roberto Rosales, Venezuelan footballer
  1988   – Dariga Shakimova, Kazakhstani boxer
  1988   – Dušan Tadić, Serbian footballer
  1988   – Rhys Wakefield, Australian actor and director
1989 – Artak Dashyan, Armenian footballer
  1989   – Babita Kumari, Indian wrestler
  1989   – Cody Linley, American actor and singer
  1989   – Agon Mehmeti, Swedish footballer
  1989   – Jonas Mendes, Bissau-Guinean footballer
  1989   – Sergei Polunin, Ukrainian ballet dancer
  1989   – Eduardo Vargas, Chilean footballer
  1989   – Dmitry Zhitnikov, Russian handballer
1990 – Haley Anderson, American swimmer
  1990   – Mark Christian, Manx cyclist
  1990   – Aleksandra Król, Polish snowboarder
  1990   – Slobodan Medojević, Serbian footballer
  1990   – Nzuzi Toko, Congolese footballer
1991 – Irene Esser, Venezuelan actress and model
  1991   – Grant Hanley, Scottish footballer
  1991   – Anthony Knockaert, French footballer
  1991   – Yvonne Leuko, Cameroonian footballer
  1991   – Kim Se-yong, South Korean singer and actor
  1991   – Tim Simona, New Zealand rugby league player
1992 – Amit Guluzade, Azerbaijani footballer
  1992   – Zoltán Harcsa, Hungarian boxer
  1992   – Maiha Ishimura, Japanese singer and actress
  1992   – Kristiina Mäkelä, Finnish triple jumper
  1992   – Gaku Matsuda, Japanese actor
  1992   – Jenna Prandini, American track and field athlete
  1992   – Brayan Ramirez, Colombian cyclist
  1992   – Frédéric Veseli, Albanian footballer
1993 – Junior Paulo, New Zealand rugby league player
  1993   – Sanjin Prcić, Bosnian footballer
  1993   – Anna Prugova, Russian ice hockey player
1994 – Timothy Kitum, Kenyan middle-distance runner
1995 – Timothy Cheruiyot, Kenyan athlete
  1995   – Iván Garcia, Spanish cyclist
  1995   – Shaolin Sándor Liu, Hungarian short track speed skater
  1995   – Kyle Snyder, American wrestler
1996 – Jack Harrison, English professional footballer
  1996   – Blaž Janc, Slovenian handballer
  1996   – Denis Zakaria, Swiss footballer
1997 – Levi Garcia, Trinidadian footballer
2000 – Connie Talbot, English singer-songwriter
2001 – Caty McNally, American tennis player
2002 – Madisyn Shipman, American actress

Deaths

Pre-1600
 284 – Numerian, Roman emperor
 763 – Domnall Midi, High King of Ireland (b. 743)
 811 – Li Fan, Chinese chancellor (b. 754)
 855 – Theoktistos, Byzantine courtier
 869 – Edmund the Martyr, English king (b. 841)
 927 – Xu Wen, Chinese general (b. 862)
 996 – Richard I, duke of Normandy (b. 932)
1008 – Geoffrey I, duke of Brittany (b. 980)
1022 – Bernward of Hildesheim, German bishop (b. c. 960)
1314 – Albert II, German nobleman (b. 1240)
1316 – John I, king of France and Navarra (b. 1316)
1400 – Elisabeth of Moravia, margravine of Meissen
1480 – Eleanor of Scotland, Scottish princess  (b. 1433)
1518 – Pierre de la Rue, Belgian singer and composer (b. 1452)
1559 – Lady Frances Brandon, English noblewoman and claimant to the throne of England (b. 1517)
1591 – Christopher Hatton, English academic and politician, Lord Chancellor of England (b. 1540)
1593 – Hans Bol, Flemish painter (b. 1534)

1601–1900
1606 – John Lyly, English poet and courtier
1612 – John Harington, English courtier and author (b. 1561)
1651 – Mikołaj Potocki, Polish nobleman (b. 1595)
1678 – Karel Dujardin, Dutch Golden Age painter (b. 1622)
1662 – Leopold Wilhelm, Austrian duke and governor (b. 1614)
1695 – Zumbi, Brazilian king (b. 1655)
1704 – Charles Plumier, French botanist and painter (b. 1646)
1737 – Caroline of Ansbach, queen of England and Ireland (b. 1683)
1742 – Melchior de Polignac, French cardinal and poet (b. 1661)
1758 – Johan Helmich Roman, Swedish violinist and composer (b. 1694)
1764 – Christian Goldbach, Prussian mathematician and theorist (b. 1690)
1773 – Charles Jennens, English landowner and patron of the arts
1778 – Francesco Cetti, Italian priest, zoologist, and mathematician (b. 1726)
1824 – Carl Axel Arrhenius, Swedish chemist (b. 1757)
1856 – Farkas Bolyai,  Romanian-Hungarian mathematician and academic (b. 1775)
1864 – Albert Newsam, American painter and illustrator (b. 1809)
1866 – Otto Karl Berg, German botanist and pharmacist (b. 1815)
1880 – Léon Cogniet, French painter (b. 1794)
1882 – Henry Draper, American doctor and astronomer (b. 1837)
1886 – William Bliss Baker, American painter (b. 1859)
1889 – August Ahlqvist, Finnish professor, poet, scholar of the Finno-Ugric languages, author, and literary critic (b. 1826)
1894 – Anton Rubinstein, Russian pianist, composer, and conductor (b. 1829)
1898 – Sir John Fowler, 1st Baronet, English engineer (b. 1817)

1901–present
1903 – Gaston de Chasseloup-Laubat, French race car driver (b. 1867)
  1903   – Tom Horn, American scout, cowboy, soldier
1907 – Paula Modersohn-Becker, German painter (b. 1876)
1908 – Albert Dietrich, German composer and conductor (b. 1829)
  1908   – Georgy Voronoy, Ukrainian mathematician and academic (b. 1868)
1910 – Leo Tolstoy, Russian author and playwright (b. 1828)
1918 – John Bauer, Swedish painter and illustrator (b.1882)
1923 – Allen Holubar, American actor and director
  1923   – Denny Barry Irish Republican, Hunger Striker (b. 1883)
1924 – Ebenezer Cobb Morley, English sportsman and the father of the Football Association and modern football (b. 1831)
1925 – Alexandra of Denmark, Queen of the United Kingdom (b. 1844)
1930 – Bill Holland, American track and field athlete (b. 1874)
1933 – Augustine Birrell, British politician (b. 1815)
1934 – Willem de Sitter, Dutch mathematician, physicist, and astronomer (b. 1872)
1935 – John Jellicoe, Royal Navy officer (b. 1859)
1936 – Buenaventura Durruti, Spanish mechanic and activist (b. 1896)
  1936   – José Antonio Primo de Rivera, Spanish lawyer and politician (b. 1903)
1938 – Maud of Wales, queen of Norway (b. 1869)
  1938   – Edwin Hall, American physicist (b. 1855)
1940 – Arturo Bocchini, Chief of Police under the Fascist regime of Benito Mussolini (b. 1880)
  1940   – Tim Coleman, English footballer (b. 1881)
  1940   – Robert Lane, Canadian footballer (b. 1882)
1941 – Elmar Muuk, Estonian linguist and author (b. 1901)
1944 – Maria Jacobini, Italian actress (b. 1892)
  1945   – Francis William Aston, English chemist and physicist, Nobel Prize laureate (b. 1877)
1947 – Wolfgang Borchert, German author and playwright (b. 1921)
1950 – Francesco Cilea, Italian composer (b. 1866)
1952 – Benedetto Croce, Italian philosopher and politician (b. 1866)
1954 – Clyde Vernon Cessna, American pilot and engineer, founded the Cessna Aircraft Corporation (b. 1879)
1957 – Mstislav Dobuzhinsky, Russian-Lithuanian painter and illustrator (b. 1875)
1959 – Sylvia Lopez, French model and actress (b. 1933)
1960 – Ya'akov Cahan, Israeli writer and translator (b. 1881)
1972 – Ennio Flaiano, Italian writer and journalist (b. 1910)
1973 – Allan Sherman, American actor, comedian, and producer (b. 1924)
1975 – Francisco Franco, Spanish general and dictator, Prime Minister of Spain (b. 1892)
1976 – Trofim Lysenko, Ukrainian-Russian biologist and agronomist (b. 1898)
1978 – Giorgio de Chirico, Greek-Italian painter and sculptor (b. 1888)
  1978   – Vasilisk Gnedov, Russian soldier and poet (b. 1890)
1980 – John McEwen, Australian lawyer and politician, 18th Prime Minister of Australia (b. 1900)
1983 – Marcel Dalio, French actor and playwright (b. 1900)
  1983   – Richard Loo, Chinese-American actor (b. 1903)
1984 – Carlo Campanini, Italian actor, singer and comedian (b. 1904)
  1984   – Kristian Djurhuus, Faroese politician, 2nd Prime Minister of the Faroe Islands (b. 1895)
  1984   – Faiz Ahmad Faiz, Pakistani journalist and poet (b. 1911)
1989 – Lynn Bari, American actress (b. 1913)
1992 – Raul Renter, Estonian economist and chess player (b. 1920)
1994 – Jānis Krūmiņš, Latvian basketball player (b. 1930)
1995 – Sergei Grinkov, Russian figure skater (b. 1967)
  1995   – Robie Macauley, American editor, novelist and critic (b. 1919)
1997 – Dick Littlefield, American baseball player (b. 1926)
  1997   – Robert Palmer, American saxophonist, producer, and author (b. 1945)
1998 – Roland Alphonso, Jamaican saxophonist (b. 1931)
  1998   – Galina Starovoytova, Russian ethnographer and politician (b. 1946)
1999 – Amintore Fanfani, Italian journalist and politician, 32nd Prime Minister of Italy (b. 1908)
2000 – Mike Muuss, American computer programmer, created Ping (b. 1958)
  2000   – Kalle Päätalo, Finnish author (b. 1919)
  2000   – Barbara Sobotta, Polish athlete (b. 1936)
2002 – Kakhi Asatiani, Georgian footballer (b. 1947)
2003 – Robert Addie, English actor (b. 1960 )
  2003   – David Dacko, African educator and politician, 1st President of the Central African Republic (b. 1930)
  2003   – Eugene Kleiner, American businessman, co-founded Kleiner Perkins Caufield & Byers (b. 1923)
2004 – Ancel Keys, American physiologist (b. 1904)
2005 – Manouchehr Atashi, Iranian journalist and poet (b. 1931)
  2005   – James King, American tenor (b. 1925)
  2005   – Chris Whitley, American singer-songwriter and guitarist (b. 1960)
2006 – Robert Altman, American director, producer, and screenwriter (b. 1925)
  2006   – Zoia Ceaușescu, Romanian mathematician and academic (b. 1950)
  2006   – Donald Hamilton, American author (b. 1916)
2007 – Kenneth S. Kleinknecht, NASA manager (b. 1919)
  2007   – Ian Smith, Rhodesian lieutenant and politician, 1st Prime Minister of Rhodesia (b. 1919)
2009 – Lino Lacedelli, Italian mountaineer (b. 1925)
2010 – Chalmers Johnson, American author and scholar (b. 1931)
2012 – Kaspars Astašenko, Latvian ice hockey player (b. 1975)
  2012   – William Grut, Swedish pentathlete (b. 1914)
  2012   – Pete La Roca, American jazz drummer (b. 1938)
  2012   – Ivan Kušan, Croatian writer (b. 1933)
2013 – Sylvia Browne, American author (b. 1936)
  2013   – Dieter Hildebrandt, Polish-German actor and screenwriter (b. 1927)
2014 – Cayetana Fitz-James Stuart, 18th Duchess of Alba (b. 1926)
2015 – Keith Michell, Australian actor (b. 1926)
  2015   – Jim Perry, American-Canadian singer and game show host (b. 1933)
  2015   – Kitanoumi Toshimitsu, Japanese sumo wrestler, the 55th Yokozuna (b. 1953)
2016 – Gabriel Badilla, Costa Rican footballer (b. 1984)
  2016   – Gene Guarilia, American basketball player (b. 1937)
  2016   – Konstantinos Stephanopoulos, Greek statesman (b. 1926)
  2016   – William Trevor, Irish novelist, playwright, and short story writer (b. 1928)
2017 – Peter Berling, German actor, film producer and writer (b. 1934)
2018 – James H. Billington, 13th Librarian of Congress (b. 1929)
  2018   – Aaron Klug, Lithuanian-English chemist and biophysicist, Nobel Prize laureate (b. 1926)
2019 – Wataru Misaka, American basketball player (b. 1923)
2020 – Jan Morris, Welsh historian, author and travel writer (b. 1926)

Holidays and observances
20-N (Spain)
Africa Industrialization Day (international)
Black Awareness Day (Brazil)
Children's Day
 Christian feast day:
Agapius
Ambrose Traversari
Ampelus and Caius
Blessed Anacleto González Flores, José Sánchez del Río, and companions (Martyrs of Cristero War)
Bernward of Hildesheim
Dasius of Durostorum
Edmund the Martyr
Felec (or Felix) of Cornwall
Gregory of Dekapolis
 Blessed Josaphata Hordashevska (Ukrainian Greek Catholic Church)
Solutor, Octavius, and Adventor
Theonestus of Vercelli
November 20 (Eastern Orthodox liturgics)
 Earliest day on which the Feast of Christ the King can fall, while November 26 is the latest; celebrated on the last Sunday before Advent. (Roman Catholic Church)
National Sovereignty Day (Argentina)
Revolution Day (Mexico)
Royal Thai Navy Day (Thailand)
Teachers' Day or Ngày nhà giáo Việt Nam (Vietnam)
Transgender Day of Remembrance (LGBT community)

References

External links

 
 
 

Days of the year
November